Thoirette is a former commune in the Jura department in the Bourgogne-Franche-Comté region of eastern France. On 1 January 2017, it was merged into the new commune Thoirette-Coisia.

Population

Personalities
Thoirette is the birthplace of the anatomist Xavier Bichat (1771–1802), whose house still exists in the older part of town.

See also 
 Communes of the Jura department

References 

Former communes of Jura (department)